The James E. Kirwan House and Store is a living museum located south of the village of Chester on Kent Island, Queen Anne's County, Maryland.  It served as a general store,  lumber mill, cooper's mill, and blacksmith shop between 1889 and 1955 and facilitated local trade as a port on Kirwan Creek.  The estate was donated to the Kent Island Heritage Society in 1998 to be run as a museum.

History
James E. Kirwan (1848-1938) was born in Baltimore and served in the Maryland oyster navy, which patrolled the Chesapeake Bay to prevent illegal oyster dredging. Kirwan married Mary Rebecca Gardner in 1867 and settled in Queen Anne's County. The couple had three children: Charles (born 1868), Sophia Lavinia (born 1870) and Lemuel (born 1872). Kirwan appears on Lake, Griffing, & Stevenson's 1877 Map of Queen Anne's County as the owner of a residence and store on the west side of what is now Dominion Road. Although advertised as a Stevensville business, Kirwan's store was strategically located between the village of Chester (then called Sharktown) and the fishing community of Dominion.

Local tradition holds that in 1889, Johnstown floodwaters washed vast quantities of lumber into the Chesapeake Bay and onto the shores of Kent Island. Kirwan is said to have bought the lumber to construct the current store on the east side of Dominion Road. The centerpiece of the complex is a ca. 1889 2 testacy, 5-bay, wood-frame I-house with an attached 2-story, 3-bay, wood-frame, front-gable store. A ca. 1889 wood-frame dairy stands immediately east of the house. Also present are a wood-frame pump house, two wood-frame sheds, a concrete fountain, and concrete garden pavers and wall remnants, all dating to the 1940s.

Significance
The James E. Kirwan House and Store is a historic structure on Kent Island registered with the Maryland Historical Trust and is the only preserved example of a 19th-century general store and farm site on Kent Island. Its self-sufficient facilities, extensive merchandise and seafaring trade showcase the economic isolation of the Eastern Shore of Maryland prior to the construction of the Chesapeake Bay Bridge.

Through its educational mission, the Kent Island Heritage Society now opens its sites (including Kirwan House, Stevensville Bank and Cray House) to the public monthly where Society docents provide guided tours.

References

External links 
 WBOC TV 2018 profile from the local TV network broadcast including aerial video of the museum
 Kent Island Heritage Society profile of the house

Museums in Queen Anne's County, Maryland
Houses completed in 1889
Kent Island, Maryland
Houses in Queen Anne's County, Maryland
Plantations in Maryland
Plantation houses in Maryland
Archaeological sites in Queen Anne's County, Maryland